The Medal of Honor (MOH) is the United States Armed Forces' highest military decoration and is awarded to recognize American soldiers, sailors, marines, airmen, guardians and coast guardsmen who have distinguished themselves by acts of valor. The medal is normally awarded by the president of the United States, but as it is presented "in the name of the United States Congress", it is sometimes referred to as the "Congressional Medal of Honor".

There are three distinct variants of the medal: one for the Army, awarded to soldiers, one for the Naval Service, awarded to sailors, marines, and coast guardsmen, and one for the Air and Space Forces, awarded to airmen and guardians. The Medal of Honor was introduced for the Naval Service in 1861, soon followed by the Army's version in 1862. The Air Force used the Army's version until they received their own distinctive version in 1965. The Medal of Honor is the oldest continuously issued combat decoration of the United States Armed Forces. The president typically presents the Medal of Honor at a formal ceremony intended to represent the gratitude of the American people, with posthumous presentations made to the primary next of kin.

According to the Medal of Honor Historical Society of the United States, there have been 3,530 Medals of Honor awarded to 3,511 individuals since the decoration's creation, with over 40% awarded for actions during the American Civil War. In 1990, Congress designated March 25 annually as "National Medal of Honor Day".

History

During the first year of the Civil War (1861–1865), a proposal for a battlefield decoration for valor was submitted to Lieutenant General Winfield Scott, the Commanding General of the United States Army, by Lieutenant Colonel Edward D. Townsend, an assistant adjutant at the Department of War and Scott's chief of staff. Scott, however, was strictly against medals being awarded, which was the European tradition. After Scott retired in October 1861, Secretary of the Navy Gideon Welles adopted the idea of a decoration to recognize and honor distinguished naval service.

On December 9, 1861, Iowa Senator James W. Grimes, Chairman on the Committee on Naval Affairs, submitted Bill S. 82 (12 Stat. 329–330) during the Second Session of the 37th Congress, "An Act to further promote the Efficiency of the Navy". The bill included a provision (Chap. 1, Sec. 7) for 200 "medals of honor", "to be bestowed upon such petty officers, seamen, landsmen, and marines as shall most distinguish themselves by their gallantry in action and other seaman-like qualities during the present war, ..." On December 21, the bill was passed and signed into law by President Abraham Lincoln. Secretary Welles directed the Philadelphia Mint to design the new military decoration. On May 15, 1862, the United States Department of the Navy ordered 175 medals ($1.85 each) from the U.S. Mint in Philadelphia with "Personal Valor" inscribed on the back of each one.

On February 15, 1862, Senator Henry Wilson, the chairman of the Senate Committee on Military Affairs and the Militia, introduced a resolution for a Medal of Honor for the Army. The resolution (37th Congress, Second Session; Resolution No. 52, 12 Stat. 623–624) was approved by Congress and signed into law on July 12, 1862 ("A Resolution to provide for the Presentation of 'Medals of Honor' to the Enlisted Men of the Army and Volunteer Forces who have distinguished, or may distinguish, themselves in Battle during the present Rebellion"). This measure provided for awarding a medal of honor "to such non-commissioned officers and privates as shall most distinguish themselves by their gallantry in action and other soldier-like qualities during the present insurrection." During the war, Townsend would have some medals delivered to some recipients with a letter requesting acknowledgment of the "Medal of Honor". The letter, written and signed by Townsend on behalf of the Secretary of War, stated that the resolution was "to provide for the presentation of medals of honor to the enlisted men of the army and volunteer forces who have distinguished or may distinguish themselves in battle during the present rebellion." By mid-November the Department of War contracted with Philadelphia silversmith William Wilson and Son, who had been responsible for the Navy's design, to prepare 2,000 medals for the Army ($2.00 each) to be cast at the mint. The Army's version had "The Congress to" written on the back of the medal. Both versions were made of copper and coated with bronze, which "gave them a reddish tint".

On March 3, 1863, Congress made the Medal of Honor a permanent decoration, and it was authorized for officers of the Army. On March 25, the Secretary of War presented the first Medals of Honor to six U.S. Army volunteers in his office.

In 1896, the ribbon of the Army's version of the Medal of Honor was redesigned with all stripes being vertical. Again, in 1904 the planchet of the Army's version of the Medal of Honor was redesigned by General George Lewis Gillespie. The purpose of the redesign was to help distinguish the Medal of Honor from other medals, particularly the membership insignia issued by the Grand Army of the Republic.

In 1917, based on the report of the Medal of Honor Review Board, established by Congress in 1916, 911 recipients were stricken off the Army's Medal of Honor list because the medal had been awarded inappropriately. Among them were William Frederick "Buffalo Bill" Cody and Mary Edwards Walker. In 1977, the Army's board for correction of military records unilaterally restored Walker's medal at the request of a relative. This was problematic for a number of reasons; the board had no authority to overturn a statute, and the restoration violated not only the period law during the Civil War, but also the law requiring revocation in 1916, and modern law in 1977. As a reaction to Walker's restoration, a relative of Buffalo Bill Cody's requested the same action from the Army's board for correction, and it reinstated the medals for Cody and four other civilian scouts on June 12, 1989.

A separate Coast Guard Medal of Honor was authorized in 1963, but not yet designed or awarded.

A separate design for a version of the medal for the Department of the Air Force was created in 1956, authorized in 1960, and officially adopted on April 14, 1965. Previously, airmen of the U.S. Air Force received the Army's version of the medal.

Appearance
There are three versions of the Medal of Honor, one for each of the military departments of the Department of Defense (DoD): the Department of the Army, Department of the Navy (Naval Service), and Department of the Air Force (Air and Space Forces). Members of the Coast Guard, part of the Department of Homeland Security, are eligible to receive the Naval version. Each medal is constructed differently and the components are made from gilding metals and red brass alloys with some gold plating, enamel, and bronze pieces. The United States Congress considered a bill in 2004 which would require the Medal of Honor to be made with 90% gold, the same composition as the lesser-known Congressional Gold Medal, but the measure was dropped.

Army variant
In the center of the star, Minerva's head surrounded by the words UNITED STATES OF AMERICA. On each ray of the star is a green oak leaf. On the reverse is a bar engraved THE CONGRESS TO with a space for engraving the name of the recipient." The pendant and suspension bar are made of gilding metal, with the eye, jump rings, and suspension ring made of red brass. The finish on the pendant and suspension bar is hard enameled, gold plated, and rose gold plated, with polished highlights.

Naval variant
The Naval version is described as "a five-pointed bronze star, tipped with trefoils containing a crown of laurel and oak. In the center is Minerva, personifying the United States, standing with her left hand resting on fasces and her right hand holding a shield emblazoned with the shield from the coat of arms of the United States. She repulses Discord, represented by snakes (originally, she was repulsing the snakes of secession). The medal is suspended from the flukes of an anchor. It is made of solid red brass, oxidized and buffed.

Air and Space Forces variant
The Air and Space Forces version is described as "within a wreath of green laurel, a gold five-pointed star, one point down, tipped with trefoils and each point containing a crown of laurel and oak on a green background. Centered on the star, an annulet of 34 stars is a representation of the head of the Statue of Liberty. The star is suspended from a bar inscribed with the word VALOR above an adaptation of Jupiter's thunderbolt from the Department of the Air Force's seal. The pendant is made of gilding metal. The connecting bar, hinge, and pin are made of bronze. The finish on the pendant and suspension bar is hard enameled, gold plated, and rose gold plated, with buffed relief.

Historic versions

The Medal of Honor has evolved in appearance over time. The upside-down star design of the Naval version's pendant adopted in early 1862 has not changed since its inception. The Army's 1862 version followed and was identical to the Naval version except an eagle perched atop cannons was used instead of an anchor to connect the pendant to the suspension ribbon. The medals featured a female allegory of the Union, with a shield in her right hand that she used to fend off a crouching attacker and serpents. In her left hand, she held a fasces. There are 34 stars surrounding the scene, representing the number of states in the union at the time. In 1896, the Army version changed the ribbon's design and colors due to misuse and imitation by nonmilitary organizations. In 1904, the Army "Gillespie" version introduced a smaller redesigned star and the ribbon was changed to the light blue pattern with white stars seen today. The 1904 Army version also introduced a bar with the word "Valor" above the star. In 1913, the Naval version adopted the same ribbon pattern.

After World War I, the Department of the Navy decided to separate the Medal of Honor into two versions, one for combat and one for non-combat. This was an attempt to circumvent the requirement enacted in 1919 that recipients participate "in action involving actual conflict with the enemy," which would have foreclosed non-combat awards. By treating the 1919 Medal of Honor as a separate award from its Civil War counterpart, this allowed the Department of the Navy to claim that it was not literally in violation of the 1919 law. The original upside-down star was designated as the non-combat version and a new pattern of the medal pendant, in cross form, was designed by the Tiffany Company in 1919. Secretary of the Navy Josephus Daniels selected Tiffany after snubbing the Commission of Fine Arts, which had submitted drawings that Daniels criticized as "un-American". The "Tiffany Cross" was to be presented to a sailor or marine who "in action involving actual conflict with the enemy, distinguish[es] himself conspicuously by gallantry and intrepidity at the risk of his life above and beyond the call of duty". Despite the "actual conflict" guidelines, the Tiffany Cross was awarded to Navy CDR (later RADM) Richard E. Byrd and Floyd Bennett for their flight to the North Pole in 1926. The decision was controversial within the Navy's Bureau of Navigation (which handled personnel administration), and officials considered asking the attorney general of the United States for an advisory opinion on the matter. Byrd himself apparently disliked the "Tiffany Cross", and eventually requested the alternate version of the medal from President Herbert Hoover in 1930. The Tiffany Cross itself was not popular among recipients—one author reflected that it was "the most short-lived, legally contentious, and unpopular version of the Medal of Honor in American history." In 1942, in response to a lawsuit, the Department of the Navy requested an amendment to expressly allow noncombat awards of the Medal of Honor. When the amendment passed, the Department of the Navy returned to using only the original 1862 inverted 5-point star design.

In 1944, the suspension ribbons for both versions were replaced with the now-familiar neck ribbon. When the Air and Space Force's version was designed in 1956, it incorporated similar elements and design from the Army version. At the Department of the Air Force leadership's insistence, the new medal depicted the Statue of Liberty's image in place of Minerva on the medal and changed the connecting device from an eagle to Jupiter's thunderbolt flanked with wings as found on the Department of the Air Force's seal.

Neck ribbon, service ribbon and lapel button

The center of the ribbon displays thirteen white stars in the form of three chevron. Both the top and middle chevrons are made up of 5 stars, with the bottom chevron made of 3 stars. The Medal of Honor is one of only two United States military awards suspended from a neck ribbon. The other is the Commander's Degree of the Legion of Merit, and is usually awarded to individuals serving foreign governments.

On May 2, 1896, Congress authorized a "ribbon to be worn with the medal and [a] rosette or knot to be worn in lieu of the medal." The service ribbon is light blue with five white stars in the form of an "M". It is placed first in the top position in the order of precedence and is worn for situations other than full-dress military uniform.

Devices
In 2011, Department of Defense instructions in regard to the Medal of Honor were amended to read "for each succeeding act that would otherwise justify award of the Medal of Honor, the individual receiving the subsequent award is authorized to wear an additional Medal of Honor ribbon and/or a 'V' device on the Medal of Honor suspension ribbon" (the "V" device is a  bronze miniature letter "V" with serifs that denotes valor). The Medal of Honor was the only decoration authorized to use the "V" device (none were ever issued) to designate subsequent awards in such a fashion. Nineteen individuals, all now deceased, were double Medal of Honor recipients. In July 2014, DoD instructions were changed to read, "A separate MOH is presented to an individual for each succeeding act that justified award.", removing the authorization for the V device.

Medal of Honor Flag 

On October 23, 2002,  was enacted, modifying , authorizing a Medal of Honor Flag to be presented to each person to whom a Medal of Honor is awarded. In the case of a posthumous award, the flag will be presented to whomever the Medal of Honor is presented to, which in most cases will be the primary next of kin of the deceased awardee.

The flag was based on a concept by retired U.S. Army Special Forces First Sergeant Bill Kendall of Jefferson, Iowa, who in 2001, designed a flag to honor Medal of Honor recipient Army Air Forces Captain Darrell Lindsey, a B-26 pilot from Jefferson who was killed in action during World War II. Kendall's design of a light blue field emblazoned with 13 white five-pointed stars was nearly identical to that of Sarah LeClerc's of the Institute of Heraldry. LeClerc's gold-fringed flag, ultimately accepted as the official flag, does not include the words "Medal of Honor" as written on Kendall's flag. The color of the field and the 13 white stars, arranged in the form of a three-bar chevron, consisting of two chevrons of five stars and one chevron of three stars, emulate the suspension ribbon of the Medal of Honor. The flag has no defined proportions.

The first Medal of Honor Flag recipient was U.S. Army Sergeant First Class Paul R. Smith, whose flag was presented posthumously. President George W. Bush presented the Medal of Honor and Flag to the family of Smith during the award ceremony for him in the White House on April 4, 2005.

Presentation

There are two distinct protocols for awarding the Medal of Honor. The first and most common is nomination and approval through the chain of command of the service member. The second method is nomination by a member of the U.S. Congress, generally at the request of a constituent. In both cases, if the proposal is outside the time limits for the recommendation, approval to waive the time limit requires a special Act of Congress. The Medal of Honor is presented by the President on behalf of, and in the name of, the Congress. Since 1980, nearly all Medal of Honor recipients—or in the case of posthumous awards, the next of kin—have been personally decorated by the president. Since 1941, more than half of the Medals of Honor have been awarded posthumously.

Evolution of criteria
 19th century: Several months after President Abraham Lincoln signed Public Resolution 82 into law on December 21, 1861, for a Navy medal of honor, a similar resolution was passed in July 1862 for an Army version of the medal. Six U.S. Army soldiers who hijacked a Confederate locomotive named The General in 1862 were the first Medal of Honor recipients; James J. Andrews led the raid. He was caught and hanged as a U.S. spy, but as a civilian, he was not eligible to receive the medal. Many Medals of Honor awarded in the 19th century were associated with "saving the flag" (and country), not just for patriotic reasons, but because the U.S. flag was a primary means of battlefield communication at the time. Because no other military decoration was authorized during the Civil War, some seemingly less exceptional and notable actions were recognized by a Medal of Honor during that conflict.
 20th century: Early in the twentieth century, the Department of the Navy awarded many Medals of Honor for peacetime bravery. For instance, in 1901, John Henry Helms aboard  was awarded the medal for saving the ship's cook from drowning. Seven sailors aboard  were awarded the medal after the ship's boiler exploded on January 25, 1904. Richard Byrd and Floyd Bennett were awarded the medal—combat ("Tiffany") version despite the existence then of a non-combat form of the Navy medal—for the 1926 flight they claim reached the North Pole. And Admiral Thomas J. Ryan was awarded the medal for saving a woman from the burning Grand Hotel in Yokohama, Japan, following the 1923 Great Kantō earthquake. Between 1919 and 1942, the Department of the Navy issued two separate versions of the Medal of Honor, one for acts related to combat and one for non-combat bravery. The criteria for the award tightened during World War I for the Army version of the Medal of Honor, while the Navy version retained a non-combat provision until 1963. In an Act of Congress of July 9, 1918, the War Department version of the medal required that the recipient "distinguish himself conspicuously by gallantry and intrepidity at the risk of his life above and beyond the call of duty", and also required that the act of valor be performed "in action involving actual conflict with an enemy". This followed shortly after the results of the Army Medal of Honor Review Board, which struck 911 medals from the Medal of Honor list in February 1917 for lack of basic prerequisites. These included the members of the 27th Maine erroneously awarded the medal for reenlisting to guard the capital during the Civil War, 29 members of Abraham Lincoln's funeral detail, and six civilians, including Buffalo Bill Cody (restored along with four other scouts in 1989) and a female doctor, Mary Edwards Walker, who had cared for the sick (this last was restored posthumously in 1977).
 World War II: As a result of lawsuits, the Department of the Navy requested the Congress expressly authorize non-combat medals in the text of the authorizing statute, since the department had been awarding non-combat medals with questionable legal backing that had caused it much embarrassment. The last non-combat Navy Medal of Honor was awarded in 1945, although the Department of the Navy attempted to award a non-combat Medal of Honor as late as the Korean War. Official accounts vary, but generally, the Medal of Honor for combat was known as the "Tiffany Cross", after the company that designed the medal. The Tiffany Cross was first awarded in 1919, but was unpopular partly because of its design as well as a lower gratuity than the Navy's original medal. The Tiffany Cross Medal of Honor was awarded at least three times for non-combat. By a special authorized Act of Congress, the medal was presented to Byrd and Bennett (see above). In 1942, the Department of the Navy reverted to a single Medal of Honor, although the statute still contained a loophole allowing the award for both "action involving actual conflict with the enemy" or "in the line of his profession". Arising from these criteria, approximately 60 percent of the medals earned during and after World War II have been awarded posthumously.
 Public Law 88–77, July 25, 1963: The requirements for the Medal of Honor were standardized among all the services, requiring that a recipient had "distinguished himself conspicuously by gallantry and intrepidity at the risk of his life above and beyond the call of duty." Thus, the act removed the loophole allowing non-combat awards to Navy personnel. The act also clarified that the act of valor must occur during one of three circumstances:
 While engaged in action against an enemy of the United States
 While engaged in military operations involving conflict with an opposing foreign force.
 While serving with friendly foreign forces engaged in an armed conflict against an opposing armed force in which the United States is not a belligerent party.

Congress drew the three permutations of combat from President Kennedy's executive order of April 25, 1962, which previously added the same criteria to the Purple Heart. On August 24, Kennedy added similar criteria for the Bronze Star Medal. The amendment was necessary because Cold War armed conflicts did not qualify for consideration under previous statutes such as the 1918 Army Medal of Honor Statute that required valor "in action involving actual conflict with an enemy", since the United States has not formally declared war since World War II as a result of the provisions of the United Nations Charter. According to congressional testimony by the Army's Deputy Chief of Staff for Personnel, the services were seeking authority to award the Medal of Honor and other valor awards retroactive to July 1, 1958, in areas such as Berlin, Lebanon, Quemoy and Matsu Islands, Taiwan Straits, Congo, Laos, Vietnam, and Cuba.

Authority and privileges
 

The four specific statutory sections authorizing the medal, as last amended on August 13, 2018, are as follows:
 Army: 
 Navy and Marine Corps: 
 Air Force and Space Force: 
 Coast Guard:  A version is authorized but it has never been awarded.

Privileges and courtesies
The Medal of Honor confers special privileges on its recipients. By law, recipients have several benefits:
 Each Medal of Honor recipient may have his or her name entered on the Medal of Honor Roll.
 Each person whose name is placed on the Medal of Honor Roll is certified to the United States Department of Veterans Affairs as being entitled to receive a monthly pension above and beyond any military pensions or other benefits for which they may be eligible.
 Enlisted recipients of the Medal of Honor are entitled to a supplemental uniform allowance.
 Recipients receive special entitlements to air transportation under the provisions of DOD Regulation 4515.13-R. This benefit allows the recipient to travel as deemed fit, as well as allows the recipient's dependents to travel either overseas–overseas, overseas–continental U.S., or continental U.S.–overseas when accompanied by the recipient.
 Special identification cards and commissary and exchange privileges are provided for Medal of Honor recipients and their eligible dependents.
 Recipients are granted eligibility for interment at Arlington National Cemetery, if not otherwise eligible.
 Fully qualified children of recipients automatically appointed to any of the United States service academies.
 Recipients receive a ten percent increase in retired pay.
 Those awarded the medal after October 23, 2002, receive a Medal of Honor Flag. The law specified that all 103 living prior recipients as of that date would receive a flag.
 Recipients receive an invitation to all future presidential inaugurations and inaugural balls.
 As with all medals, retired personnel may wear the Medal of Honor on "appropriate" civilian clothing. Regulations specify that recipients of the Medal of Honor are allowed to wear the uniform "at their pleasure" with standard restrictions on political, commercial, or extremist purposes (other former members of the armed forces may do so only at certain ceremonial occasions).
 Forty states offer a special license plate for certain types of vehicles to recipients at little or no cost to the recipient. The states that do not offer Medal of Honor specific license plate offer special license plates for veterans for which recipients may be eligible.

Saluting

 Although not required by law or military regulation, members of the uniformed services are encouraged to render salutes to recipients of the Medal of Honor as a matter of respect and courtesy regardless of rank or status, whether or not they are in uniform. This is one of the few instances where a living member of the military will receive salutes from members of a higher rank. According to paragraph 1.6.1.1 of Air Force Instruction 1-1, the United States Air Force requires that salutes be rendered to Medal of Honor recipients.

Legal protection

 1904: The Army redesigned its Medal of Honor, largely a reaction to the copying of the Medal of Honor by various veterans organizations, such as the Grand Army of the Republic. To prevent the making of copies of the medal, Brigadier General George Gillespie, Jr., a Medal of Honor recipient from the Civil War, applied for and obtained a patent for the new design. General Gillespie received the patent on November 22, 1904, and he transferred it the following month to the Secretary of War at the time, William Howard Taft.
 1923: Congress passed a statute (the year before the 20-year term of the patent would expire)—which would later be codified at 18 U.S.C. §704—prohibiting the unauthorized wearing, manufacturing, or sale of military medals or decorations. In 1994, Congress amended the statute to permit an enhanced penalty if the offense involved the Medal of Honor.
 2006: The Stolen Valor Act of 2005 was enacted. The law amended 18 U.S.C. § 704 to make it a federal criminal offense for a person to deliberately state falsely that he or she had been awarded a military decoration, service medal, or badge. The law also permitted an enhanced penalty for someone who falsely claimed to have been awarded the Medal of Honor.
 June 28, 2012: In the case of United States v. Alvarez, the Supreme Court of the United States held that the Stolen Valor Act of 2005's criminalization of the making of false claims of having been awarded a military medal, decoration, or badge was an unconstitutional violation of the First Amendment's guarantee of free speech. The case involved an elected official in California, Xavier Alvarez, who had falsely stated at a public meeting that he had been awarded the Medal of Honor, even though he had never served in any branch of the armed forces. The Supreme Court's decision did not specifically address the constitutionality of the older portion of the statute which prohibits the unauthorized wearing, manufacturing, or sale of military medals or decorations. Under the law, the unauthorized wearing, manufacturing, or sale of the Medal of Honor is punishable by a fine of up to $100,000 and imprisonment of up to one year.
 June 3, 2013: President Barack Obama signed into law a revised version of the Stolen Valor Act, making it a federal offense for someone to represent themselves as awardees of medals for valor in order to receive benefits or other privileges (such as grants, educational benefits, housing, etc.) that are set aside for veterans and other service members. As of 2017, there were only two reported arrests and prosecutions under the law, leading at least 22 states to enact their own legislation to criminalize stolen valor amid claims that the federal law was virtually unenforced.

Duplicate medals
Medal of Honor recipients may apply in writing to the headquarters of the service branch of the medal awarded for a replacement or display Medal of Honor, ribbon, and appurtenance (Medal of Honor flag) without charge. Primary next of kin may also do the same and have any questions answered in regard to the Medal of Honor that was awarded.

Recipients

 The first Medals of Honor were awarded and presented to six U.S. Army soldiers ("Andrews Raiders") on March 25, 1863, by Secretary of War Edwin Stanton, in his office of the War Department. Private Jacob Parrott, a U.S. Army volunteer from Ohio, became the first actual Medal of Honor recipient, awarded for his volunteering for and participation in a raid on a Confederate train in Big Shanty, Georgia, on April 12, 1862, during the American Civil War. After the medal presentations, the six decorated soldiers met with President Lincoln in the White House.
 The first U.S. Navy sailors were awarded the Medal of Honor on April 3, 1863. 41 sailors received the award, with 17 awards for action during the Battle of Forts Jackson and St. Philip.
 The first, and so far only, Coast Guardsman to be awarded the Medal of Honor was Signalman First Class Douglas Munro. He was posthumously awarded it on May 27, 1943, for evacuating 500 marines under fire on September 27, 1942, during the Battle of Guadalcanal.
 The only woman awarded the Medal of Honor is Mary Edwards Walker, who was a civilian Army surgeon during the American Civil War. She received the award in 1865 after the Judge Advocate General of the Army determined that she could not be given a retroactive commission, and so President Andrew Johnson directed that "the usual medal of honor for meritorious services be given her."

 The first black recipients of the Medal of Honor were sixteen Army soldiers and sixteen Navy sailors that fought during the Civil War. The first award was announced on April 6, 1865, to twelve black soldiers from the five regiments of U.S. Colored Troops who fought at New Market Heights outside of Richmond on September 29, 1864.  The first black man to earn the Medal of Honor was William Harvey Carney.  He earned the Medal during the Battle of Ft Wagner, but was not presented with it until 1900.

The 1917 Medal of Honor Board deleted 911 awards, but only 910 names from the Army's Medal of Honor list, including awards to Mary Edwards Walker, William F. "Buffalo Bill" Cody and the first of two awards issued February 10, 1887, to George W. Mindil, who retained his award issued October 25, 1893. None of the 910 "deleted" recipients were ordered to return their medals, although on the question of whether the recipients could continue to wear their medals, the Judge Advocate General advised the Medal of Honor Board that the Army was not obligated to police the matter. Walker continued to wear her medal until her death. Although some sources claim that President Jimmy Carter formally restored her medal posthumously in 1977, this action was actually taken unilaterally by the Army's Board for Correction of Military Records. The Army Board for Correction of Military Records also restored the Medals of Honor of Buffalo Bill and four other civilian scouts in 1989.
 Sixty-one Canadians who served in the United States Armed Forces, mostly during the American Civil War. Since 1900, four Canadians have received the medal. The only Canadian-born, naturalized U.S. citizen to receive the medal for heroism during the Vietnam War was Peter C. Lemon.

While the governing statute for the Army's Medal of Honor, beginning in 1918, explicitly stated that a recipient must be "an officer or enlisted man of the Army", "distinguish himself conspicuously by gallantry and intrepidity at the risk of his life above and beyond the call of duty", and perform an act of valor "in action involving actual conflict with an enemy", exceptions have been made:
 Charles Lindbergh, 1927, civilian pilot, and U.S. Army Air Corps reserve officer. Lindbergh's medal was authorized by a special act of Congress.
 Major General (Retired) Adolphus Greely was awarded the medal in 1935, on his 91st birthday, "for his life of splendid public service". The result of a special act of Congress similar to Lindbergh's, Greely's medal citation did not reference any acts of valor.
 Foreign unknown recipients include five WWI Unknowns: the Belgian Unknown Soldier, the British Unknown Warrior, the French Unknown Soldier, the Italian Unknown Soldier, and the Romanian Unknown Soldier.
 U.S. unknown recipients include one each from four wars: World War I, World War II, Korea, and Vietnam. The Vietnam Unknown was later identified as Air Force First Lieutenant Michael Blassie through the use of DNA identification. Blassie's family asked for his Medal of Honor, but the Department of Defense denied the request in 1998. According to Undersecretary of Defense Rudy de Leon, the medal was awarded symbolically to all Vietnam unknowns, not to Blassie specifically.

Note that the number of Air Force recipients does not count recipients from its pre-September 19, 1947, Army-related predecessor organizations.

Double recipients
Nineteen service members have been awarded the Medal of Honor twice. The first double Medal of Honor recipient was Thomas Custer (brother of George Armstrong Custer) for two separate actions that took place several days apart during the American Civil War.

Five "double recipients" were awarded both the Army's and Navy's Medal of Honor for the same action, with all five of these occurrences taking place during World War I. No modern recipients have more than one medal because of laws passed for the Army in 1918, and for the Navy in 1919, which stipulated that "no more than one medal of honor . . . shall be issued to any one person," although subsequent awards were authorized by issuance of bars or other devices in lieu of the medal itself. The statutory bar was finally repealed in the FY2014 defense bill, at the request of the Office of the Secretary of Defense, meaning that recipients can now be issued more than one medal. However, no more than one medal may be issued for the same action.

To date, the maximum number of Medals of Honor earned by any service member has been two. The last living individual to be awarded two Medals of Honor was John J. Kelly October 3, 1918; the last individual to receive two Medals of Honor for two different actions was Smedley Butler, in 1914 and 1915.

Related recipients
Arthur MacArthur, Jr. and Douglas MacArthur are the first father and son to be awarded the Medal of Honor. The only other such pairing is Theodore Roosevelt (awarded in 2001) and Theodore Roosevelt, Jr.

Five pairs of brothers have received the Medal of Honor:
 John and William Black, in the American Civil War. The Blacks are the first brothers to be so honored.
 Charles and Henry Capehart, in the American Civil War, the latter for saving a drowning man while under fire.
 Antoine and Julien Gaujot. The Gaujots also have the unique distinction of receiving their medals for actions in separate conflicts, Antoine in the Philippine–American War and Julien when he crossed the Mexican border to rescue Mexicans and Americans in a Mexican Revolution skirmish.
 Harry and Willard Miller, during the same naval action in the Spanish–American War.
 Allen and James Thompson, in the same American Civil War action.
Another notable pair of related recipients are Admiral Frank Friday Fletcher (rear admiral at the time of award) and his nephew, Admiral Frank Jack Fletcher (lieutenant at the time of award), both awarded for actions during the United States occupation of Veracruz.

Late awards
Since 1979, 86 late Medal of Honor awards have been presented for actions from the Civil War to the Vietnam War. In addition, five recipients whose names were not included on the Army's Medal of Honor Roll in 1917 had their awards restored.
A 1993 study commissioned by the U.S. Army investigated "racial disparity" in the awarding of medals. At the time, no Medals of Honor had been awarded to U.S. soldiers of African descent who served in World War II. After an exhaustive review, the study recommended that ten Distinguished Service Cross recipients be awarded the Medal of Honor. On January 13, 1997, President Bill Clinton presented the Medal of Honor to seven of these World War II veterans, six of them posthumously and one to former Second Lieutenant Vernon Baker.

In 1998, a similar study of Asian Americans resulted in President Bill Clinton presenting 22 Medals of Honor in 2000. Twenty of these medals went to U.S. soldiers of Japanese descent of the 442nd Regimental Combat Team (442nd RCT) who served in the European Theater of Operations during World War II. One of these Medal of Honor recipients was Senator Daniel Inouye, a former U.S. Army officer in the 442nd RCT.

In 2005, President George W. Bush presented the Medal of Honor to Tibor Rubin, a Hungarian-born American Jew who was a Holocaust survivor of World War II and enlisted U.S. infantryman and prisoner of war in the Korean War, whom many believed to have been overlooked because of his religion.

On April 11, 2013, President Obama presented the Medal of Honor posthumously to Army chaplain Captain Emil Kapaun for his actions as a prisoner of war during the Korean War. This follows other awards to Army Sergeant Leslie H. Sabo, Jr. for conspicuous gallantry in action on May 10, 1970, near Se San, Cambodia, during the Vietnam War and to Army Private First Class Henry Svehla and Army Private First Class Anthony T. Kahoʻohanohano for their heroic actions during the Korean War.

As a result of a congressionally mandated review to ensure brave acts were not overlooked due to prejudice or discrimination, on March 18, 2014, President Obama upgraded Distinguished Service Crosses to Medals of Honor for 24 Hispanic, Jewish, and black individuals—the "Valor 24"—for their actions in World War II, the Korean War and the Vietnam War. Three were still living at the time of the ceremony.

On November 6, 2014, President Obama presented the Medal of Honor posthumously to First Lieutenant Alonzo Cushing for actions on July 3, 1863, during the Battle of Gettysburg. Lieutenant Cushing's award is the last Medal of Honor to be presented to a soldier in the American Civil War, after 151 years since the date of the action.

27th Maine and other revoked awards

During the Civil War, Secretary of War Edwin M. Stanton promised a Medal of Honor to every man in the 27th Maine Volunteer Infantry Regiment who extended his enlistment beyond their separation date. The Battle of Gettysburg was imminent, and 311 men of the regiment volunteered to serve until the battle was resolved. The remaining men returned to Maine, and with the Union victory at Gettysburg the 311 volunteers soon followed. They arrived back in Maine in time to be discharged with the men who had returned earlier. Since there seemed to be no official list of the 311 volunteers, the War Department exacerbated the situation by forwarding 864 medals to the commanding officer of the regiment. The commanding officer only issued the medals to the volunteers who stayed behind and retained the others on the grounds that, if he returned the remainder to the War Department, the War Department would try to reissue the medals.

In 1916, a board of five Army generals on the retired list convened under act of law to review every Army Medal of Honor awarded. The board was to report on any Medals of Honor awarded or issued "for any cause other than distinguished conduct by an officer or enlisted man in action involving actual conflict with an enemy." The commission, led by Nelson A. Miles, identified 911 awards for causes other than distinguished conduct. This included the 864 medals awarded to members of the 27th Maine regiment; 29 servicemen who served as Abraham Lincoln's funeral guard; six civilians, including Mary Edwards Walker and Buffalo Bill Cody; and 12 others. Walker's medal was restored by the Army Board for Correction of Military Records in 1977, an action that is often attributed to President Jimmy Carter in error. Cody and four other civilian scouts who rendered distinguished service in action, and who were therefore considered by the board to have fully earned their medals, also had their medals restored by the Army Board for Correction of Military Records in 1989. The report issued by the Medal of Honor review board in 1917 was reviewed by the Judge Advocate General, who also advised that the War Department should not seek the return of the revoked medals from the recipients identified by the board. In the case of recipients who continued to wear the medal, the War Department was advised to take no action to enforce the statute.

Similarly-named U.S. decorations
The following decorations, in one degree or another, bear similar names to the Medal of Honor, but are entirely separate awards with different criteria for issuance:
 Cardenas Medal of Honor: decoration of the United States Revenue Cutter Service, which was later merged into the United States Coast Guard
 Congressional Space Medal of Honor: the highest honor for NASA astronauts

See also

 African-American Medal of Honor Recipients Memorial
 Distinguished Intelligence Cross
 Home of the Heroes, a recognition of Pueblo, Colorado, for being the hometown of four Medal of Honor recipients
 Kentucky Medal of Honor Memorial
 List of Medal of Honor recipients
 Medal of Honor Memorial (Indianapolis)
 Merchant Marine Distinguished Service Medal
 Military awards and decorations
 Texas Medal of Honor Memorial

References

Footnotes

Citations

Works cited

Further reading

External links

 Congressional Medal of Honor Society
 U.S. Army Medal of Honor
 Submarine Force Medal of Honor Recipients. Submarine Force Museum website
 List of Native Americans who have received the Medal of Honor
 History, Legend and Myth: Hollywood and the Medal of Honor (Medal of Honor recipients depicted on film)
 National Medal of Honor Museum of Military History in Chattanooga, Tennessee
 American Valor PBS/WETA.
 Loubat, J. F. and Jacquemart, Jules, Illustrator, The Medallic History of the United States of America 1776–1876.
 U.S. Army Institute of Heraldry: Medal of Honor-Army
 U.S. Army Institute of Heraldry: Medal of Honor-Navy
 U.S. Army Institute of Heraldry: Medal of Honor-Air Force
 Pritzker Military Museum & Library

 
1862 establishments in the United States
Awards established in 1862